is a Japanese sprinter. He competed in the men's 200 metres at the 1996 Summer Olympics.

References

1976 births
Living people
Athletes (track and field) at the 1996 Summer Olympics
Japanese male sprinters
Olympic athletes of Japan
Place of birth missing (living people)